Dandaleith railway station served the village of Craigellachie, Moray, Scotland from 1858 to 1965 on the Morayshire Railway.

History 
The station opened as Craigellachie on 23 December 1858 by the Great North of Scotland Railway. It was the southern terminus of the line until  opened in 1863. To the north was a goods yard. The station's name was changed to Dandaleith in 1864 to avoid confusion with the Craigellachie station that opened to the south a year before. It was downgraded to an unstaffed halt in 1931, although it became staffed after 7 June 1953. Eventually, only one train a day called at the station and it closed to both passengers on 5 March 1962 and closed to goods traffic on 18 November 1965.

References 

Disused railway stations in Moray
Former Great North of Scotland Railway stations
Railway stations in Great Britain opened in 1858
Railway stations in Great Britain closed in 1962
1858 establishments in Scotland
1962 disestablishments in Scotland